"Comanchero" is a song by Raggio Di Luna (Moon Ray). It was written by Italian record producer Aldo Martinelli and Simona Zanini and released as a single in 1984 on Discotto S.A.S. It became a hit single in several European countries, reaching number 2 in Austria, number 3 in West Germany, number 4 in Switzerland, number 5 in France and number 17 in Italy. In 1997, the song was covered and released as a single by Robin Cook.

Track listings
7" Single (Ariola 107 053)
"Comanchero" (Vocal) – 3:58
"Comanchero" (Instrumental) – 4:04

12" Maxi (Ariola 601 573 / Il Discotto 1043)
"Comanchero" (Vocal) – 7:38
"Comanchero" (Instrumental) – 6:28

12" Maxi (Ariola 601 679)
"Comanchero" (Special Disco Remix) – 8:35
"Comanchero" (Instrumental) – 6:24

Charts

Weekly charts

Year-end charts

References

Bibliography

1984 songs
1984 debut singles
1997 singles
Italo disco songs